Luzhkov is a Russian male surname, its feminine counterpart is Luzhkova. Notable people with the surname include:

Sergei Luzhkov (born 1990), Russian association football player
Yury Luzhkov (1936–2019), Russian politician

Russian-language surnames